Raúl Martínez (born 9 November 1926) is an Argentine fencer who competed in the individual épée event at the 1960 Summer Olympics.

References

External links
 

1926 births
Possibly living people
Argentine male fencers
Argentine épée fencers
Olympic fencers of Argentina
Fencers at the 1960 Summer Olympics
Sportspeople from Córdoba Province, Argentina
Pan American Games medalists in fencing
Pan American Games gold medalists for Argentina
Pan American Games bronze medalists for Argentina
Fencers at the 1955 Pan American Games
Fencers at the 1963 Pan American Games
20th-century Argentine people